People who served as the Deputy Leader of Australian Labor Party in New South Wales are:

 

New South Wales Labor leaders
New South Wales Labor leaders
Labor